Hamza bin Osama bin Mohammed bin 'Awad bin Laden (or ), better known as Hamza bin Laden, was a Saudi Arabian-born member of Al-Qaeda. He was a son of Al-Qaeda leader Osama bin Laden, and, following his father's death in 2011, he was described as an emerging leader within the group.

Early life and family
Hamza bin Laden was born in 1989 in Jeddah, Saudi Arabia.  In January 2001, Hamza, his father and other family members attended the wedding of his brother Mohammed bin Laden in the southern Afghan city of Kandahar. Video footage shot in Ghazni province in November of the same year shows Hamza bin Laden and some of his siblings handling U.S. helicopter wreckage and working alongside the Taliban.

In March 2003, it was claimed that Hamza bin Laden and his brother Saad bin Laden had been wounded and captured in Ribat, Afghanistan. This claim eventually proved false. However, Hamza bin Laden and other Al Qaeda leaders sought refuge in Iran after the 9/11 attacks.

Bin Laden married a daughter of Abdullah Ahmed Abdullah when he was 17 years old.

In August 2018, The Guardian quoted bin Laden's uncles as saying he had married a daughter of 9/11 hijacker Mohamed Atta. However, Hamza's brother Omar bin Laden denied the report.

Al-Qaeda activities
In a 2005 video titled The Mujahideen of Waziristan, Hamza bin Laden is shown participating in an al-Qaeda assault on Pakistani security forces in the south Waziristan tribal region between Afghanistan and Pakistan. In September 2007, it was reported that he was again in the tribal belt which encompasses the Pakistan/Afghanistan border region taking a senior role with al-Qaeda forces.

In July 2008, a translation of a poem said to be written by bin Laden was made available, which had been published on an extremist Islamic Web site. In the poem bin Laden wrote "Accelerate the destruction of America, Britain, France and Denmark." In response British MP Patrick Mercer dubbed Hamza bin Laden the Crown Prince of Terror.

Bin Laden was implicated in the 2007 assassination of former Pakistani Prime Minister Benazir Bhutto. However, according to an interrogation of former al-Qaeda spokesman Sulaiman Abu Ghaith, bin Laden was under house arrest in Iran when Bhutto was assassinated and was not released until 2010, or in 2011, when he and other bin Laden family members were freed in exchange for an Iranian diplomat held in Pakistan.

On 14 August 2015, he released an audio message for the very first time. He called upon followers in Kabul, Baghdad and Gaza to wage jihad, or holy war, on Washington, London, Paris and Tel Aviv.

It was reported on 11 May 2016 he had released an audio message focused on the issues of Palestine and the Syrian Civil War. He said the "blessed Syrian revolution" had made the prospect of "liberating" Jerusalem more likely. "The Islamic umma (nation) should focus on jihad in al-Sham (Syria) … and unite the ranks of mujahedin," he said. "There is no longer an excuse for those who insist on division and disputes now that the whole world has mobilised against Muslims."

In July 2016, media reported that he had issued an audio message threatening the United States in revenge for his father's death. In the 21-minute speech entitled "We Are All Osama", he said "We will continue striking you and targeting you in your country and abroad in response to your oppression of the people of Palestine, Afghanistan, Syria, Iraq, Yemen, Somalia and the rest of the Muslim lands that did not survive your oppression," Hamza bin Laden said. "As for the revenge by the Islamic nation for Sheikh Osama, may Allah have mercy on him, it is not revenge for Osama the person but it is revenge for those who defended Islam." In May 2017, a recording by Hamza bin Laden was published by As-Sahab, encouraging terrorist attacks against Western targets.

It is rumored that he pledged allegiance to Jama'at Ansar al-Furqan in Bilad al Sham in 2017. In the light of his growing influence within al-Qaeda, the United States classified Hamza bin Laden as a Specially Designated Global Terrorist in January 2017. This designation effectively put him on a blacklist which was aimed at restricting his movement and economic abilities.

In May 2017, a video was released in which he calls on his followers to carry out lone wolf attacks against Jews, Americans, Westerners and Russians  with whatever means are available to them.

On 28 February 2019, the United States Department of State offered a reward of up to US$1 million for information leading to the identification or location in any country of bin Laden.

The Kingdom of Saudi Arabia announced on 1 March 2019 that it had revoked bin Laden's citizenship through a royal decree signed in November 2018.

May 2011 raid
Hamza bin Laden was the son of Khairiah Sabar of Saudi Arabia, one of Osama bin Laden's three wives who were living in the Abbottabad compound.

Interrogation of the surviving wives of Osama bin Laden by Pakistani intelligence after the raid on the Abbottabad compound revealed Hamza was the only person missing. He was not among those killed or injured.  The raid conducted by the SEAL team was thorough: infrared technology, as well as ground troops, remained confident nobody inside the compound had escaped. There were no hidden exit tunnels from the compound.

In a letter confiscated in the raid, written by Osama bin Laden and addressed to his "Chief of Staff" Atiyah Abd al-Rahman, bin Laden mentions his desire that his son Hamza would be educated in Qatar as a religious scholar so that he could "refute the wrong and the suspicions raised around Jihad." The same letter revealed that Hamza did not escape the raid because he was not even present in Abbottabad.  Letters from the compound also confirmed that Osama was apparently grooming his son to be his heir, following the death of Hamza's older brother Saad bin Laden in a 2009 US drone strike.

Death

On 31 July 2019, The New York Times and other news organizations quoted unnamed American officials as saying that bin Laden was said to have been killed in the first two years of the Trump administration, which began on January 20, 2017. At the time, intelligence agencies were unable to confirm his death and, in February 2019, the U.S. State Department issued a $1 million reward for information leading to bin Laden's whereabouts. On September 14, 2019, U.S. President Donald Trump confirmed that bin Laden had been killed in a U.S. counterterrorism operation in the Afghanistan/Pakistan region. Other details were not disclosed.

Afghan journalist Bilal Sarwary stated that bin Laden was most likely killed in Geru district in Ghazni province of Afghanistan.

Maryam, Hamza bin Laden's widow and the daughter of the Egyptian high-ranking member of al-Qaeda and its bombmaker Abdullah Ahmed Abdullah (nom de guerre Abu Muhammed al-Masri), was killed in August 2020 in Tehran, Iran alongside her father. This has however been denied by Iran.

See also

Bin Laden family

References

External links
  Jon Gambrell, Born into al-Qaida: Hamza bin Laden’s rise to prominence, Associated Press, March 17, 2019

1989 births
2010s deaths
Al-Qaeda propagandists
Saudi Arabian propagandists
Assassinated al-Qaeda leaders
Hamza
Individuals designated as terrorists by the United States government
Osama bin Laden
People from Jeddah
People of the War in Afghanistan (2001–2021)
Saudi Arabian al-Qaeda members
Stateless people
Date of death unknown
Saudi Arabian people of Yemeni descent
Saudi Arabian people of Syrian descent